Leslie Illsley was an English artist and sculptor based in West Penwith. He was one of the founders of the Troika group (also known as Troika Pottery). Illsley is also the brother of prominent St Ives artist Bryan Illsley.

Early life
Illsley was the second of three brothers born and raised in Surbiton. He attended Kingston College of Art where he graduated. He attended evening classes as Central St Martins in 1959 whilst working as a sculptor repairing Westminster Abbey by day. In 1960 entered the Young Contemporaries competition beating such names as Peter Blake, Maurice Agis and David Hockney to first prize. Illsley's influences were diverse from Brancusi and Paul Klee to Rembrandt.

Troika

Illsley ran Troika with Benny Sirota from 1963 until Benny left the business in 1980 and eventually it closed in 1983. The Troika designs were mostly by  Caroline Illsley, his first wife, who he met at Kingston School of Art. Together they produced the Troika ‘Love Plaque’. This arguably made Leslie Illsley one of Britains most prolific artists.

Further reading

Cashmore, Carol (1994). Troika Pottery St Ives. 
 Perrott, George (2003). Troika Ceramics of Cornwall. Gemini Publications. 
 Harris, Ben and Illsley, Lawrence (2013). Troika 63-83. It's Pronounced Aitch Publishing.

References

1936 births
1989 deaths
20th-century English painters
English male painters
English male sculptors
20th-century English male artists